In theoretical physics, the superconformal algebra is a graded Lie algebra or superalgebra that combines the conformal algebra and supersymmetry. In two dimensions, the superconformal algebra is infinite-dimensional. In higher dimensions, superconformal algebras are finite-dimensional and generate the superconformal group (in two Euclidean dimensions, the Lie superalgebra does not generate any Lie supergroup).

Superconformal algebra in dimension greater than 2 
A (possibly incomplete) list is

Superconformal algebra in 3+1D 
Here,  denote spacetime indices;  left-handed Weyl spinor indices;  right-handed Weyl spinor indices; and  the internal R-symmetry indices.

The Lie superbrackets of the bosonic conformal algebra are given by

where η is the Minkowski metric; while the ones for the fermionic generators are:

The bosonic conformal generators do not carry any R-charges, as they commute with the R-symmetry generators:

But the fermionic generators do carry R-charge:

Under bosonic conformal transformations, the fermionic generators transform as:

Superconformal algebra in 2D 

There are two possible algebras with minimal supersymmetry in two dimensions; a Neveu–Schwarz algebra and a Ramond algebra.  Additional supersymmetry is possible, for instance the N = 2 superconformal algebra.

See also 
 Conformal symmetry
 Super Virasoro algebra
 Supersymmetry algebra

References 

Conformal field theory
Supersymmetry
Lie algebras